The Riwa Fort (also  Fort), locally known as Kala Qilla or Black Fort, is a fort in central Mumbai (Bombay), India on the banks of the Mithi River. The fort is currently in a dilapidated condition amidst the Dharavi slums. It was built by the Mughal governor of Bombay, Yakut Khan. It was part of the larger Bombay Castle, and marked the northern portion of Mughal-held Bombay in the 17th century. The castle was also used as a watchtower, guarding the territory against the Portuguese-held Salsette Island. The Riwa Fort was later captured by the Marathas.

The fort comes under the jurisdiction of the Maharashtra Directorate of Archaeology and Museums.

See also
List of forts in Maharashtra

References

External links 
Forts of Greater Bombay
Bombay during colonial rule

Archaeological sites in Maharashtra
History of Mumbai
1670s establishments in the British Empire